Jatai is a village in the Bhiwani district of the Indian state of Haryana. , the village had 525 households with a population of 2,952 of which 1,604 were male and 1,348 female.

References

Villages in Bhiwani district